Monica Huppert (born 1964) is a Canadian make-up artist who has worked in Tomorrowland, Stargate SG-1, Star Trek Beyond and Deadpool. She won the Saturn Award in 2017 for the Best Make-Up for her work on "Star Trek: Beyond" with Joel Harlow. She made her name working in the Canadian film sets where she identified working with the cold, drying out the actors skin was one of the issues she had to deal with. In Deadpool 2 Huppert headed up the Makeup Department as well as being responsible for "Domino's" makeup. Sappho New Paradigm produce an eyeshadow named after her.

Selected filmography

 Deadpool 2,  2018
 Death Note, 2017
 Power Rangers, 2017
 Deadpool, 2016
 Star Trek Beyond, 2016
 The Age of Adaline, 2015
 Tomorrowland, 2015
 Seventh Son, 2014
 Hector and the Search for  Happiness, 2014
 Warm Bodies, 2013
 50/50, 2011
 Mission: Impossible – Ghost Protocol, 2011
 Red Riding Hood, 2011
 Marmaduke, 2010
 Juno, 2007
 The Last Mimzy, 2007
 Snakes on a Plane, 2006
 Fantastic Four, 2005
 The Fog, 2005
 The 4400, 2004
 The Chronicles of Riddick, 2004
 Dead Like Me, 2003
 Final Destination 2, 2003
 X2, 2003
 Dark Angel, 2000
 Stargate SG-1, 1999

References

External links
 

1964 births
Living people
Canadian make-up artists